A total solar eclipse will occur on Tuesday, August 23, 2044. A solar eclipse occurs when the Moon passes between Earth and the Sun, thereby totally or partly obscuring the image of the Sun for a viewer on Earth. A total solar eclipse occurs when the Moon's apparent diameter is larger than the Sun's, blocking all direct sunlight, turning day into darkness. Totality occurs in a narrow path across Earth's surface, with the partial solar eclipse visible over a surrounding region thousands of kilometres wide.

Totality will be visible across the Northwest Territories and Alberta as well as extreme southwestern Saskatchewan in Canada, and will be widely visible in Montana and parts of North Dakota and South Dakota in the United States of America; partiality will be visible throughout the western United States near sunset and in Siberia.

This is the last of 41 umbral solar eclipses (annular, total or hybrid) of Solar Saros 126. The first umbral was in 1323 and last will be in 2044. The total duration is 721 years.

Images 
Animated path

Related eclipses

Solar eclipses of 2044–2047

Saros 126

Metonic cycle

References

External links 
 http://eclipse.gsfc.nasa.gov/SEplot/SEplot2001/SE2044Aug23T.GIF

2044 in science
2044 8 23
2044 8 23